Alan Story (10 November 1913 – 10 May 1979) was an Australian rules footballer who played with the Hawthorn Football Club in the Victorian Football League (VFL).

References

External links 

1913 births
1979 deaths
Australian rules footballers from Victoria (Australia)
Hawthorn Football Club players
People educated at Scotch College, Melbourne